(born May 18, 1973) is a former Grand Prix motorcycle road racer from Japan.

Ukawa began his Grand Prix career in 1994, racing in the 250cc world championships. He finished second to Valentino Rossi in the 1999 World Championship. In 2002, he moved up to the MotoGP class, riding for the factory Repsol Honda Grand Prix team, finishing third overall behind teammate Rossi, with a win at Phakisa in South Africa. In 2003, he finished seventh overall for the Sito Pons Pramac team before returning to a factory testing role. Ukawa won five Grand Prix races during his career and is a five-time winner of the Suzuka 8 Hours endurance race.

Career

Points system from 1993 onwards:

Grand Prix motorcycle racing

By season

Races by year

(key) (Races in bold indicate pole position; races in italics indicate fastest lap)

References

External links

1973 births
Living people
Japanese motorcycle racers
Repsol Honda MotoGP riders
500cc World Championship riders
250cc World Championship riders
MotoGP World Championship riders